The Riverfront Irish Festival is an annual music and cultural festival held since 1993 in Cuyahoga Falls, Ohio.

The festival takes place during the second weekend of June and is estimated to attract 50,000 visitors. Activities include Irish music and other Celtic music, food and drink, dancing, cultural exhibits, games, sports, arts and crafts, and children's activities. The festival was cancelled in 2019; it was postponed the next year caused by the COVID-19 pandemic.  The festival is returning in 2021 on June 11–13 and is publishing a list of performers already booked.

Music festivals in Ohio
Irish-American culture in Ohio
Music festivals established in 1993
Tourist attractions in Summit County, Ohio
Cuyahoga Falls, Ohio
1993 establishments in Ohio
2019 disestablishments in Ohio